Das Hohelied Salomos ("The Song of Solomon") is the sixth album by Popol Vuh. It was originally released in 1975, on United Artists Records. In 2005, SPV re-released the album with three bonus tracks.

Track listing
All tracks composed by Florian Fricke except 2, 9 composed by Florian Fricke and Daniel Fichelscher, and 7 composed by Daniel Fichelscher.  Lyrics by Salomo arranged by Florian Fricke.

 "Steh auf, zieh mich Dir nach" – 4:44
 "Du schönste der Weiber" – 4:28
 "In den Nächten auf den Gassen I" – 1:33
 "Du Sohn Davids I" – 2:59
 "In den Nächten auf den Gassen II" – 3:26
 "Der Winter ist vorbei" – 3:42
 "Ja, Deine Liebe ist süßer als Wein" – 3:36
 "Du Sohn Davids II" – 3:47
 "Du tränke mich mit Deinen Küssen" – 4:57

2005 bonus tracks
"In den Nächten auf den Gassen III" – 2:10 
"Schön bist Du vor Menschensöhnen" (Alternative Session) – 2:45 
"Mitten im Garten" (Alternative Piano Version) – 4:50

Personnel
Florian Fricke – piano
Daniel Fichelscher – electric guitar, acoustic guitar, percussion
Djong Yun – vocals

Guest musicians
Alois Gromer – sitar
Shana Kumar – tabla

Credits
Recorded at Bavaria Studio, Munich, February 1975
Engineered by Klaus Meier and Wolfgang Loper, assisted by Libuse Tomas and Hardy Bank
Electronics by Florian Fricke, Frank Fiedler, and Robert Wedel
Mixed and produced by Florian Fricke and Reinhard Langowski
Art direction and design by Ulli Eichberger

References

External links

Furious.com (Comprehensive article & review of every album, in English)
Enricobassi.it (featuring the original credits)
Venco.com.pl

Popol Vuh (band) albums
1975 albums
German-language albums
United Artists Records albums
SPV GmbH albums